Catherine Lisa Bell (born 14 August 1968) is a British-American actress and model known for her roles as Lieutenant Colonel Sarah MacKenzie in the television series JAG from 1997 to 2005, Denise Sherwood in the series Army Wives from 2007 to 2013, and Cassandra "Cassie" Nightingale in Hallmark's The Good Witch films and television series from 2008 to 2021.

Early life
Catherine Lisa Bell was born on 14 August 1968 in London to a Scottish father, Peter Bell, and an Iranian mother, Mina Ezzati. Peter was working as an architect under contract to an oil company in Iran; Mina had travelled to London to study nursing. Bell's parents divorced when Catherine was two years old. She was raised by her mother and maternal grandparents. The family eventually moved to California's San Fernando Valley where Bell was exposed to diverse influences. The family spoke Persian at home. Her grandparents were Muslim, but Catherine was also exposed to Catholicism and attended a Baptist summer camp. In her teenage years, Catherine came under the influence of her California surroundings: "I am definitely a Valley Girl. I was a tomboy. I liked to skateboard, play football, and push the envelope a little bit". Catherine enrolled at UCLA, where she considered a career in medicine or research. However, when she was offered a modelling job in Japan, where advertisers value "American beauty", she dropped out during her second year.

Career
When Bell returned to the United States, she decided to try acting. She studied at the Beverly Hills Playhouse with Milton Katselas. She also worked as a massage therapist for eight years at the Peninsula Hotel, and her clients included singer Peter Gabriel. Bell's first television acting role was one line spoken to Gabriel on the short-lived 1990 sitcom Sugar and Spice.

Among her first parts was serving as Isabella Rossellini's nude body double for the 1992 film Death Becomes Her.

In 1994, Bell starred in the Dolph Lundgren film Men of War. While filming the movie in Thailand, Bell and her co-star Trevor Goddard bonded over contracting amoebic dysentery. Goddard would play Bell's off-and-on love interest Mic Brumby the following year on JAG. They remained friends until Goddard's death from a drug overdose in June 2003, an event that the bereaved Bell described as "horrible".

In 1995, she obtained a three-line role in one episode of the NBC TV series JAG, which centers on the work of the United States Department of the Navy's Judge Advocate General office. NBC canceled the show after which it was picked up by CBS, which restructured the series, incorporating a female Marine Corps lawyer character, Sarah MacKenzie. Bell auditioned for that role and won it. One episode of the show established that MacKenzie is an Iranian-American, and featured Bell speaking Persian. She continued in this role until the series ended in 2005.

Beginning in 2007, Bell starred in Lifetime's ensemble drama series Army Wives as Denise Sherwood, the wife of a U.S. Army lieutenant colonel, who endures domestic violence at the hands of her teenage son during the show's first season.

Bell played the role of Cassandra "Cassie" Nightingale, the main character of Hallmark's The Good Witch (2008), and its sequels The Good Witch's Garden (2009), The Good Witch's Gift (2010), The Good Witch's Family (2011), The Good Witch's Charm (2012), The Good Witch's Destiny (2013), and The Good Witch's Wonder (2014). She was also a co-executive producer of all of the movies. She also starred in the Lifetime movie titled Last Man Standing (2011).

In 2015, it was reported that Bell would star in the movie Love Finds Its Way, which would begin filming in 2016. Production began on the film in March 2017, with Vancouver as the filming location, and 9 July 2017 as the date for the film's premiere on the Hallmark Channel.

On 2 April 2019, CBS announced that Bell would be reprising her JAG role of Sarah "Mac" MacKenzie alongside former co-star David James Elliott for a multi-episode arc in the tenth season of NCIS: Los Angeles.

In 2022, Bell starred in the Lifetime film Jailbreak Lovers as part of its "Ripped from the Headlines" feature film which tells the story of how Toby Dorr snuck inmate John Manard out of prison in a dog crate which sparked a manhunt.

Personal life
Bell is fluent in Persian and English. She is fond of motorcycling, skiing, snowboarding and kickboxing. Her hobbies include cross-stitching and making model cars, which she has done since age eight.

In 2002, The Sporting News falsely reported that Bell correctly predicted that the New England Patriots would beat the St. Louis Rams in Super Bowl XXXVI, 20 to 17 in a celebrity survey conducted just before the season started. However, Bell's prediction occurred after the NFC and AFC championship games had already been completed, so she did not predict the teams that would be participating, only the final score.

During the 2007–2008 Writers Guild of America strike, Bell took flying lessons in a Cirrus SR22. 

Bell met actor-production assistant Adam Beason on the set of the 1992 film Death Becomes Her. They were married on 8 May 1994. They are the parents of two children, Gemma and Ronan. They lived in a nearly  faux-Tuscan-style mini-mansion in Calabasas, California. The couple sold the house in 2010, and publicly confirmed that they had separated sometime before September 2011. They eventually divorced in 2011.

Since 2012, Bell has lived with fellow Scientologist, photographer and party planner Brooke Daniells, together with their children, in Los Angeles. In 2014, Bell paid US$2.05 million for a single-story ranch house on a  lot in the gated Hidden Hills community in the western suburbs of Los Angeles.

Scientology
Bell was raised Roman Catholic and attended an all-girls Catholic school (Our Lady of Corvallis High School in Los Angeles). She is a practicing Scientologist. Bell has attested to attaining the Scientology state of Clear. She has supported Scientology's Hollywood Education and Literacy Project. In December 2005, Bell helped promote the gala opening of the Citizens Commission on Human Rights (a Scientology supported group), "Psychiatry: An Industry of Death" museum. In February 2006, Bell appeared in a Scientology music video called "United". The film includes cameo performances by Isaac Hayes, Erika Christensen, Jenna Elfman and Lynsey Bartilson and claims to promote human rights with a rap song.

Filmography

Film

Television

See also
 Agra catbellae – A species of beetle named after Catherine Bell

References

External links

 
 
 
 

1968 births
Living people
Actresses from London
Actresses of Iranian descent
American female models
American film actresses
American people of Iranian descent
American people of Scottish descent
American Scientologists
American television actresses
British actresses of Asian descent
British female models
British film actresses
British television actresses
Converts to Scientology from Roman Catholicism
English emigrants to the United States
English people of Iranian descent
English people of Scottish descent
English Scientologists
Bisexual actresses
English LGBT actors
LGBT actresses
People with acquired American citizenship
University of California, Los Angeles alumni